The World Trade Center Kochi is a twin tower commercial complex located in InfoPark, Kochi, India. Opened in 2016, it is the fourth World Trade Center in India and second in South India after the World Trade Center Bangalore. 

Located inside Infopark Phase I campus in the Information technology hub of Kakkanad, the complex houses multinational corporations like IBM, KPMG, Xerox, IQVIA, EXL, Nielsen and UST Global. KPMG has taken up more than 260,000 square feet of office space at tower 1 employing more than 2,500 professionals from this facility.

The WTC Kochi center is spread across 770,000 square feet in two towers each of 10 storeys. The complex was built by Brigade Group who holds the WTCA licenses for all the major South Indian cities.

See also
Infopark, Kochi
SmartCity, Kochi
List of World Trade Centers
List of tallest buildings in Kochi

References

External links
 World Trade Center Kochi

Kochi